Michèle Jacot (born 5 January 1952) is a French former alpine skier.

Born at Le Pont-de-Beauvoisin, she won the Alpine Skiing World Cup of the 1970 season and World Champion in the combined event (1970). , she is the last and only French alpine skier to win the Women's Overall Alpine Skiing World Cup. She also competed at the 1972 Winter Olympics and the 1976 Winter Olympics.

World Cup victories

Overall

Individual races

References

External links

1952 births
Living people
French female alpine skiers
FIS Alpine Ski World Cup champions
Olympic alpine skiers of France
Alpine skiers at the 1972 Winter Olympics
Alpine skiers at the 1976 Winter Olympics
Sportspeople from Isère